International Game Technology PLC (IGT), formerly Gtech S.p.A. and Lottomatica S.p.A., is a multinational gambling company that produces slot machines and other gambling technology. The company is headquartered in London, with major offices in Rome, Providence, Rhode Island, and Las Vegas. It is controlled, with a 51 percent stake, by De Agostini.

Italian gambling company Lottomatica acquired Gtech Corporation, a US gambling company, in August 2006, and later changed its own name to Gtech. Gtech managed many state and provincial lotteries in the US and had contracts with local and national lotteries in Europe, Australia, Latin America, the Caribbean, and Asia.

In 2015, the company acquired American gambling company International Game Technology and again adopted the acquired company's name as its own.

Current holdings
With the 2006 acquisition of Gtech, the company increased its global business activities due to a permanent presence of its employees in several countries throughout the world. IGT has operations in more than 100 countries worldwide, and deals with various ethnicities and nations with different levels of local employment laws. In order to meet these various requirements, IGT complies with the principles of the International Labor Office's Tripartite Declaration of Principles concerning Multinational Enterprises and its social policy (Geneva 2000). In particular, the Company complies with all of the recommendations in the aforementioned declaration with regard to relations with staff in the various states.

In July 2014, Gtech agreed to acquire American company International Game Technology (IGT), the world's largest slot machine manufacturer, for a total of $6.4 billion, including $4.7 billion in cash and $1.7 billion in assumed debt. The companies combined under a new holding company based in the United Kingdom, and the Gtech name was dropped in favor of IGT.

In April 2015, Gtech completed its merger with IGT. The new combined company's name is International Game Technology PLC.

In February 2022, IGT announced their expansion into Washington state via a multi-year deal with Kalispel tribe.

In March 2022, International Gaming Technology’s subsidiary IGT global services announced their 6-year partnership agreement with Singapore Pools Limited.

In April 2022, International Games Technology announced their deal to acquire igaming content provider iSoftBet for approximately €160 million.

References

External links

Gambling companies of the United Kingdom
Manufacturing companies based in London
Companies based in the City of Westminster
Gambling companies established in 1990
Companies listed on the New York Stock Exchange
Electronics companies established in 1990
1990 establishments in England
Slot machine manufacturers